In Mourning is a melodic death metal band from Vansbro, Sweden. They are currently signed to Dalapop. They have released six full-length albums with their latest The Bleeding Veil, released in November 2021.

History
Apart from their debut album, the band has published several self-released demos. Their debut album, Shrouded Divine, released on 2 January 2008 by Aftermath Music, has received mostly favorable reviews, especially by European music websites and magazines. Their second album Monolith was released on 25 January 2010 by Pulverised Records, with which they would have a contract for two albums.

On 29 November 2011, the band announced on their official website that Spinefarm Records would be releasing their new album, The Weight of Oceans, in 2012. The album entered the Finnish charts at number 40.

On 16 January 2014, it was announced that drummer Christian Netzell had decided to leave the band after 14 years of playing due to musical differences. On the same day it was noted that drummer Mattias Bender would replace Netzell for their Trondheim Metal Fest show, and for the rest of the 2014 tour season.

On 26 March 2014, In Mourning announced Bender will now be their permanent full-time drummer and is set to be involved in the recording of their new album.

On 22 December 2014, In Mourning announced that Bender had left the band, and that Daniel Liljekvist, formerly of Katatonia, will step in for the Poland and Norway gigs.

On 20 May 2016, In Mourning released their fourth studio album Afterglow on Agonia Records.

On 4 October 2019, In Mourning released their fifth studio album Garden of Storms on Agonia Records.

On 24 July 2020, In Mourning re-released their second studio album Monolith through Agonia Records.

On August 13, 2021, Joakim Strandberg-Nilsson was revealed as Dark Tranquillity's session drummer for their upcoming tour in 2021 and 2022.

On November 26, 2021, In Mourning released their sixth studio album The Bleeding Veil on Dalapop.

Members

Current
Tobias Netzell – vocals, guitars 
Björn Petterson – guitars  vocals 
Tim Nedergård – guitars 
Joakim Strandberg-Nilsson - drums 

Former
Tommy Eriksson – guitars 
Christian Netzell – drums 
Jon Solander – guitars, vocals 
Mattias Bender – drums 
Pierre Stam – bass 
Daniel Liljekvist - drums 
Sebastian Svalland - bass 

Timeline

Discography

Studio albums
 Shrouded Divine (2008)
 Monolith (2010)
 The Weight of Oceans (2012)
 Afterglow (2016)
 Garden of Storms (2019)
 The Bleeding Veil (2021)

Demos

 In Mourning (2000)
 Senseless (2002)
 Need (2003)
 Confessions of the Black Parasite (2004)
 Grind Denial (2006)

References

Musical groups established in 2000
Swedish progressive metal musical groups
Swedish gothic metal musical groups
Swedish melodic death metal musical groups
Musical quintets